Timo Heikki Koponen (b. 1942) Is a Finnish diplomat, a master of political science . He has been Minister Counselor in Copenhagen 1981–1985, Head of Office at the Ministry for Foreign Affairs 1985–1989, Ambassador of Finland in Jakarta 1989–1992 and Bucharest 1992– 1996. He has also been an ambassador in Reykjavik 2000–2004.

References 

Ambassadors of Finland to Indonesia
Ambassadors of Finland to Romania
Ambassadors of Finland to Iceland
1942 births
Living people